Winnebago Mission (Hoocąk: Mišin, also known as Indian Mission) is an unincorporated community located in the town of Komensky, Jackson County, Wisconsin, United States. For the 2020 census, it was recorded as the Mission census-designated place and had a population of 297.

References

Unincorporated communities in Jackson County, Wisconsin
Unincorporated communities in Wisconsin
Census-designated places in Jackson County, Wisconsin
Census-designated places in Wisconsin